Chiefdom of Yongning was a Mosuo autonomous Tusi chiefdom during the Ming and Qing dynasties. The chiefdom was located at present-day Ninglang Yi Autonomous County at the convergence of Yunnan, Sichuan and Tibet.

According to legend, the ancestor of Yongning chieftains was from Tibet. He arrived at Yongning in 24 AD. Yongning was a part of Nanzhao and later a part of the Dali Kingdom. Mongolian invaded Dali in 1253. He Zi (和字), the chieftain of Yongning, surrendered to the Mongol Empire, which was then administered by the Yuan dynasty.

Yongning swore allegiance to the Ming dynasty since 1371. Chieftain Budu Geji (卜都各吉) went to the Ming capital to have an audience with the Hongwu Emperor in 1381, from then on, Yongning joined the Ming Tusi System. Since 1406, the hereditary chieftains received the official position "Magistrate of Yongning" (永寧知府) from the Ming emperor.

A Ju (阿苴) was the first chieftain who used the surname "A" (阿). Joseph Rock stated that the surname was given by the Ming emperor. On one occasion the chieftain came to have an audience with the Ming emperor. The chieftain did not understand the Chinese language. When the Ming emperor spoke to him, he replied "ah", so was given the surname "A".

According to The Ancient Nakhi Kingdom of Southwest China by Joseph Rock, Yongning used to be great power. However, in 1648, Muli was given to a lama and established the Chiefdom of Muli; later, in 1710, Yongning was divided into several chiefdoms under the order of the Kangxi Emperor.

In 1917, Chiefdom of Langqu (蒗蕖土司) was abolished, its territory merged into Yongning. Since then, Yongning changed its name to Ninglang. Yongning Chiefdom was abolished by the Chinese Communist Party in 1956.

List of chieftains of Yongning

See also
Mosuo
Chiefdom of Lijiang
Nakhi people

References

Tusi in Yunnan
Lijiang
States and territories established in 1381
States and territories disestablished in 1956